Lothar Voigtländer (born 3 September 1943) is a German composer.

Life 
Voigtländer was born in Leisnig. He received his formative musical education between 1954 and 1962 as a choirboy and later as choir prefect in the Dresdner Kreuzchor under Rudolf Mauersberger. From 1961 to 1968 he studied conducting with Rolf Reuter and music composition with Fritz Geißler at the Leipzig Academy of Music and from 1970 to 1972 as a master student at the Akademie der Künste der DDR with Günter Kochan.

Since 1973 Voigtländer has worked as a freelance artist in Berlin. In 1984 he founded together with Georg Katzer the "Society for electroacoustic music". In 1992 he received a guest professorship at the University of Paris, was chairman of the Berlin Composers' Association from 1990 to 1996, member of the Federal Executive Board of the German Composers' Association and vice-chairman of the works committee of the Gesellschaft für musikalische Aufführungs- und mechanische Vervielfältigungsrechte. Since 2001 Voigtländer has been an honorary professor for composition at the Hochschule für Musik Carl Maria von Weber in Dresden, and since 2006 he has been a member of the GEMA supervisory board.

Voigtländer founded several concert series in Berlin, including the "Long Night of Electronic Sounds". Electroacoustic works led him to the studios International Confederation of Electroacoustic Music in Bourges, Zurich, Hilversum, Freiburg (WDR), Budapest and Bratislava. Voigtländer has received international prizes, he was awarded several times at the Festival of Electroacoustic Music in Bourges (Grand Prix 1996).

In 2015, he received the Order of Merit of the Federal Republic of Germany on ribbon

Work 
Voigtländer's compositions include stage works, Tanztheater, electro-acoustic sound performances, sound sculptures, space-sound installations, motets and choral songs, solo songs, chamber musics, orchestra and Organ pieces.

(mainly published by Edition Peters, B&H/DVfM)

Antike Epigramme for mixed choir, text: Catull, Sulpicia, Ausonius, 1975.
Drei elektronische Studien for voice and tape, text: Erich Arendt, 1975.
Orchestermusik I „Memento“, Hommage á Schostakowitsch, 1975.
Vier Minnelieder des Oswald von Wolkenstein for tenor and Orchestra, 1977.
Einmal Lieder for high voice and piano, texts: Federico García Lorca, Louis Aragon and Friedemann Berger, 1977.
Am Ende des Regenbogens (choir cycle) 8 songs for mixed choir a cappella after texts by Berger, Kahlau, Morgenstern, Strittmatter, Rive und Ketschua-Lyrik. 1978, Edition Peters 1983
vergesse...durcheinander...o süße for vocals, 4 trombones., 4 percussions., text: Marc Braet, Erich Fried, Samuel Beckett, E. E. Cummings, (1983, revised with tape 2005).
Maikäfer flieg, electro-acoustic soundtrack, 1985.
Litaneia, Motet for baritone and 2 mixed choirs, 1985, rev. 1987.
Orchestermusik II, 1988.
II. Sinfonie. Harfen-Sinfonie, 1989.
Le temps en cause, Kammeroratorium, text: Eugène Guillevic, 1990.
III. Sinfonie. Orgel- Sinfonie, 1990.
Trällerlieder, Kinder-Liedsammlung, 1970–1990.
Adoratio, Motet, text: Thomas v. Aquino, 1994.
Voici-Feuerklang! for soprano, double bass, 2 percussionists, tape, live electronics, pyrotechnics, Rheinsberg, 1995.
Guillevic-Recital, Collage for 3 speakers and tape with painting by Dieter Tucholke, Berlin 1996.
Lichtklang Nr.2, Sound sculpture for the German Reichstag Berlin with the architect Wolfgang Heinrich Fischer, 1999.
Missa Electroacoustica in 4 parts, electro-acoustic compositions to videos by Veit Lup, steel sculptures by Reinhardt Grimm and choreographies by Iris Sputh, 2002.
Visages, KammerSzenario (chamber opera) in 8 parts (E. Guillevic) for soprano, 3 narrators, 3 dancers, 3 percussionists, piano trio, trombone, clarinet and electronic space-sound compositions, Rheinsberg 2002.
glockenfern-glasschärfe-schwarz, dance performance for 3 Chinese singing bowls and tape, 2005.
Orchestermusik III was immer ein wenig zittert, das ist dann in uns, 2005.

Radio play music 
 1991: Edgar Hilsenrath: Das Märchen vom letzten Gedanken – Regie: Peter Groeger (Hörspiel – SFB/HR)

Literature 
 Albrecht von Massow, Thomas Grysko, Josephine Prkno (ed.): Ein Prisma ostdeutscher Musik: Der Komponist Lothar Voigtländer. Böhlau Verlag, Köln/Weimar/Wien 2015.
 Über Voigtländer-Aufführungen des Dresdner Kreuzchores, in Matthias Herrmann (ed.): Dresdner Kreuzchor und zeitgenössische Chormusik. Ur- und Erstaufführungen zwischen Richter und Kreile. Marburg 2017, 96–98,  (Schriften des Dresdner Kreuzchores, vol. 2)

References

External links 
 
 Website von Lothar Voigtländer
 Lothar Voigtländer im Archiv Zeitgenössischer Komponisten der Saxon State and University Library Dresden
 

20th-century classical composers
20th-century German composers
Recipients of the Cross of the Order of Merit of the Federal Republic of Germany
1943 births
Living people
People from Leisnig